|}

The Zetland Stakes is a Group 3 flat horse race in Great Britain open to two-year-old horses. It is run on the Rowley Mile at Newmarket over a distance of 1 mile and 2 furlongs (2,012 metres), and it is scheduled to take place each year in October.

The event was classed at Listed level until it became an ungraded conditions race in 2007. It returned to Listed level in 2015.  It was previously run at Newmarket's last racing fixture of the year but was moved in 2015 to become part of the course's Future Champions Festival. It was upgraded again to Group 3 level from the 2019 running.

Records

Leading jockey since 1980 (3 wins):
 Greville Starkey – Grand Tour (1986), Mamaluna (1988), Rock Hopper (1989)
 Ryan Moore - Under The Rainbow (2005), Indigo Way (2010), Kew Gardens (2017)

Leading trainer since 1980 (5 wins):
 Mark Johnston – Double Trigger (1993), Double Eclipse (1994), Trigger Happy (1997), Empire Day (2006), Hartnell (2013)

Winners since 1980

See also
 Horse racing in Great Britain
 List of British flat horse races

References

 Paris-Turf: 
 Racing Post:

 ifhaonline.org – International Federation of Horseracing Authorities – Zetland Stakes (2019). pedigreequery.com – Zetland Stakes – Newmarket.''

Flat races in Great Britain
Newmarket Racecourse
Flat horse races for two-year-olds